The economy of Bhutan is based on agriculture and forestry, which provide the main livelihood for more than 60% of the population. Agriculture consists largely of subsistence farming and animal husbandry. Rugged mountains dominate the terrain and make the building of roads and other infrastructure difficult. Bhutan is among the richest by gross domestic product (nominal) per capita in South Asia, at $3,491 as of 2022, but it still places 153rd, and among the poorest in the world. The total gross domestic product is only $2,653 million, and 178th according to IMF.

Bhutan's economy is closely aligned with India's through strong trade and monetary links and dependence on India's financial assistance. Most production in the industrial sector is of the cottage industry type. Most development projects, such as road construction, rely on Indian migrant labour. Model education, social, and environment programs are underway with support from multilateral development organisations.

Each economic program takes into account the government's desire to protect the country's environment and cultural traditions. For example, the government, in its cautious expansion of the tourist sector, encourages visits by upscale, environmentally conscientious tourists. Detailed controls and uncertain policies in areas such as industrial licensing, trade, labour, and finance continue to hamper foreign investment. Hydropower exports to India have boosted Bhutan's overall growth, even though GDP fell in 2008 as a result of a slowdown in India, its predominant export market.

Since 1961, the government of Bhutan has guided the economy through five-year plans in order to promote economic development.

Macro-economic trend

This is a chart of trend of gross domestic product of Bhutan at market prices  by the International Monetary Fund:

Bhutan's hydropower potential and its attraction for tourists are key resources. The Bhutanese Government has made some progress in expanding the nation's productive base and improving social welfare.

In 2010, Bhutan became the first country in the world to ban smoking and the selling of tobacco. In order to stamp out cross-border smuggling during the pandemic, a new Tobacco Control Rules and Regulations (TCRR) 2021 allowed the import, sales and consumption of tobacco products.

GNH versus GDP 
In the 1970s the King placed Gross National Happiness over Gross Domestic Product.

See also 
 Agriculture in Bhutan
 Banking in Bhutan
 Mining in Bhutan
 Fishing in Bhutan
 Forestry in Bhutan
 Bhutanese ngultrum, currency

References
Notes

Public domain

Citations

Further reading

External links
Global Economic Prospects: Growth Prospects for South Asia The World Bank, 13 December 2006